Delaware Crossing may refer to

An event:
 George Washington's crossing of the Delaware River with the Continental Army prior to the Battle of Trenton on December 26, 1776
 Washington Crossing the Delaware (1851 painting), an oil painting depicting the above

A place:
 Washington Crossing State Park, a state park of New Jersey
 Washington Crossing Historic Park, a state park of Pennsylvania
 Grinter Place, a house on the US National Register of Historic Places above the Kansas River in the Muncie neighborhood of Kansas City, Kansas.